The meridian 79° east of Greenwich is a line of longitude that extends from the North Pole across the Arctic Ocean, Asia, the Indian Ocean, the Southern Ocean, and Antarctica to the South Pole.
The 79th meridian east forms a great circle with the 101st meridian west.

From Pole to Pole
Starting at the North Pole and heading south to the South Pole, the 79th meridian east passes through:

{| class="wikitable plainrowheaders"
! scope="col" width="120" | Co-ordinates
! scope="col" | Country, territory or sea
! scope="col" | Notes
|-
| style="background:#b0e0e6;" | 
! scope="row" style="background:#b0e0e6;" | Arctic Ocean
| style="background:#b0e0e6;" | 
|-valign="top"
| style="background:#b0e0e6;" | 
! scope="row" style="background:#b0e0e6;" | Kara Sea
| style="background:#b0e0e6;" | Passing just west of Ushakov Island, Krasnoyarsk Krai,  Passing just west of Uyedineniya Island, Krasnoyarsk Krai, 
|-
| 
! scope="row" | 
| Krasnoyarsk Krai — Nosok Island
|-
| style="background:#b0e0e6;" | 
! scope="row" style="background:#b0e0e6;" | Kara Sea
| style="background:#b0e0e6;" |
|-
| 
! scope="row" | 
| Krasnoyarsk Krai — Sibiryakov Island
|-
| style="background:#b0e0e6;" | 
! scope="row" style="background:#b0e0e6;" | Kara Sea
| style="background:#b0e0e6;" | Yenisei Gulf
|-valign="top"
| 
! scope="row" | 
| Yamalo-Nenets Autonomous Okrug Krasnoyarsk Krai — from  Yamalo-Nenets Autonomous Okrug — from Khanty-Mansi Autonomous Okrug — from  Tomsk Oblast — from  Novosibirsk Oblast — from  Altai Krai — from 
|-
| 
! scope="row" | 
| Passing through Lake Balkhash
|-
| 
! scope="row" | 
|
|-valign="top"
| 
! scope="row" | 
| Xinjiang
|-
| 
! scope="row" | Aksai Chin
|-valign="top"
| 
! scope="row" | 
| Tibet
|-
| 
! scope="row" | Aksai Chin
|-valign="top"
| 
! scope="row" | 
| Tibet
|-
| 
! scope="row" | 
| Ladakh
|-valign="top"
| 
! scope="row" | 
| Tibet
|-
| 
! scope="row" | Aksai Chin
|-valign="top"
| 
! scope="row" | 
|-
| style="background:#b0e0e6;" | 
! scope="row" style="background:#b0e0e6;" | Indian Ocean
| style="background:#b0e0e6;" | Palk Strait
|-
| 
! scope="row" | 
| Tamil Nadu
|-
| style="background:#b0e0e6;" | 
! scope="row" style="background:#b0e0e6;" | Indian Ocean
| style="background:#b0e0e6;" |
|-
| style="background:#b0e0e6;" | 
! scope="row" style="background:#b0e0e6;" | Southern Ocean
| style="background:#b0e0e6;" |
|-
| 
! scope="row" | Antarctica
| Australian Antarctic Territory, claimed by 
|-
|}

See also
78th meridian east
80th meridian east

References

e079 meridian east